The George Blossom House in Chicago was designed by architect Frank Lloyd Wright in 1892, while Wright was still working in the firm of Adler and Sullivan. As Wright was working as a draftsman for Adler and Sullivan, he was forbidden from taking outside commissions. He later referred to these designs as his "bootleg houses".

A fine example of a Colonial Revival design, the building is almost symmetrical, broken up by a conservatory on the rear of the building.

References

 Storrer, William Allin. The Frank Lloyd Wright Companion. University Of Chicago Press, 2006,  (S.014)

External links
Photographs with explanatory text from "The Wright Library".
Photograph and explanation of the building "The Frank Lloyd Wright Trust"

Frank Lloyd Wright buildings
Houses completed in 1892
Houses in Chicago